Sirduleh may refer to:
 Sirduleh, Harsin
 Sirduleh, Sonqor